Hamilton Central School, located on West Kendrick Avenue,
Hamilton, New York was established in 1946. It educates students in kindergarten through grade 12, with an average class size of 45 and a teacher to student ratio of 1:10.

Newspaper 
Hamilton boasts an award-winning school paper. The Emerald Press has been coming out weekly since 1990, and has won several awards in national competitions.

Theater activities
The middle and high schools present two productions a year, usually a play in the fall and a musical in the spring.

Athletics
Hamilton Central School is in the Class D division for sports.  It has won five state championships in the last 15 years, and more state titles than any other school in the central New York area.

The men's basketball team won states in the 1993–94 season, mostly because of Adonal Foyle. Foyle continued his basketball career with three years at Colgate University (1995–98), and played mostly for the Golden State Warriors in the NBA. He also played for the Orlando Magic and Memphis Grizzlies. He retired in 2009.

Hamilton Central School has won a number of state championships in various sports.

Notable alumni 
 Adonal Foyle - professional basketball player
 Sage Hurta - Professional Track and Field Athlete

References

External links
 

Public high schools in New York (state)
Educational institutions established in 1946
Schools in Madison County, New York
Public middle schools in New York (state)
Public elementary schools in New York (state)
1946 establishments in New York (state)